In baseball, an opening pitcher, more frequently referred to as an opener, is a pitcher who specializes in getting the first outs in a game, before being replaced by a long reliever or a pitcher who would typically be a starting pitcher. Pitchers employed in the role of opener have usually been relief pitchers by trade. The strategy was frequently employed in Major League Baseball (MLB) by the Tampa Bay Rays during the 2018 season, when it was adopted by other teams as well.

Concept and early use
By the 1980s, MLB teams had adopted starting rotations consisting of five starting pitchers, with all other pitchers on the active roster serving as relief pitchers. Traditionally, a starter was expected to throw the most innings of any pitcher in a game. Starters typically pitched until they got into trouble or reached a pitch count threshold, or the game ended.

In Game 7 of the 1924 World Series, the Washington Senators had their starting pitcher, the right-handed Curly Ogden, pitch to only two batters and then brought in a left-handed pitcher, with the intent of locking the opposing team into their left-handed lineup. Similarly, in the 1990 National League Championship Series, the Pittsburgh Pirates decided to open the game with right-handed relief pitcher Ted Power before installing the announced starting pitcher, left-hander Zane Smith, in an attempt to get the Cincinnati Reds to change their batting lineup. In 1993, the Oakland Athletics had a poor starting rotation, and manager Tony La Russa and pitching coach Dave Duncan split their pitchers into platoons, with a core of dedicated relief pitchers. Though the experiment lasted for only six games before the Athletics returned to a traditional starting rotation, Ron Darling, a member of the 1993 Athletics, called it "a precursor to all the things that you see today". La Russa and Duncan also used an opener on the last day of the 2007 Major League Baseball season when their St. Louis Cardinals handed the ball to Troy Percival, a longtime closer with 358 career saves and 702 relief appearances to go along with this, his only career start. Percival worked an inning before being relieved by Kip Wells, a pitcher for whom 219 of his 296 career appearances were as a starter.

In the 21st century, baseball writers advanced the idea that starting pitchers are less effective against the opposing team's hitters the more times in a game they face them. Dave Fleming, a writer for Bill James Online, wrote in 2009 about a proposed "3-3-3 rotation" where pitchers would be limited to throwing three innings in a game. Bryan Grosnick, writing for SB Nation's Beyond the Box Score, suggested using an opening pitcher for an inning or two before giving way to a more traditional starting pitcher in a 2013 article. In his 2016 book, Ahead of the Curve, Brian Kenny suggested the possible use of an opening pitcher, noting that the highest scoring inning is typically the first inning, so a team should use a relief pitcher to shut down the top of the opposing team's batting order.

2018 MLB season
The Tampa Bay Rays began experimenting with an opener during the 2018 season, first utilizing the strategy on May 19. The first pitcher they chose to deploy as the opener was Sergio Romo, a veteran who has served as a closer. Romo pitched in the role again on May 22 and 23. The Rays returned Romo to their closer role in June, and they continued to use an opener, primarily turning to Ryne Stanek, Diego Castillo and Hunter Wood for the role, regularly using Ryan Yarbrough, Yonny Chirinos, and Jalen Beeks in immediate relief of the opener. The Rays saw their team earned run average (ERA) decrease after beginning to use the strategy. The Rays' openers recorded a 3.97 ERA in a combined 93 innings pitched, which bested the league average ERA of 4.15. During the summer, the Rays also experimented with an opener in their Double-A and Triple-A affiliates.

In June, the Los Angeles Dodgers used Scott Alexander as an opener due to injuries in their starting rotation. The Minnesota Twins, Oakland Athletics, and Texas Rangers also employed openers in the last month of the 2018 season. In the nine games in which the Athletics used the opener strategy in September (with Liam Hendriks serving as opener in eight of those games), they posted a win–loss record of 4–5 and a 1.86 ERA. The Athletics also chose to use Hendriks as the opener, unsuccessfully, in the 2018 American League Wild Card Game. In the 2018 National League Championship Series, the Milwaukee Brewers used starter Wade Miley as an opener in Game 5. He pitched to only one batter before being replaced, becoming just the second pitcher in MLB playoff history to start a game and face only one batter.

When Farhan Zaidi became general manager of the San Francisco Giants after the 2018 season, he spoke about using an opener to protect Dereck Rodriguez and Andrew Suarez from being overworked.

2019 MLB season

The Tampa Bay Rays continued to use an opener in many of their games, with Ryne Stanek often filling the role. However, interest and usage in the opener strategy was far less pronounced than the season previous. The New York Yankees coped with having three of their starting pitchers on the injured list by using reliever Chad Green as an opener. Green would pitch the first inning or two and then hand over the game to a long reliever. During the 2019 regular season, Green opened 15 games for the Yankees; the Yankees won 11 of the games that he started. The Los Angeles Angels pitched a no-hitter using an opener, with Taylor Cole working the first two innings and Félix Peña the last seven in their 13–0 no-hitter against the Seattle Mariners on July 12.

Advantages
One advantage of the strategy is that the opener, who is often a hard-throwing specialist, can be called in to face the most dangerous hitters, who are usually near the top of the batting order, the first time they come to bat. If the opener is successful, the job of the next pitcher is easier since they will start with less-dangerous hitters. The strategy also throws off the timing of the top-of-the-order hitters, who are not used to seeing different pitchers each time they come to bat, and allows the usual starting pitcher to face the top of the lineup two times rather than three.

From a financial perspective, the strategy allows teams to make more use of relief pitchers who are still under low-paying contracts, potentially reducing the salaries paid to starting pitchers because the latter are used less. Also, pitchers not starting games causes them to be less likely to receive win–loss decisions or receive as many "games started," which greatly affects subsequent arbitration hearings and financial compensation in future contract negotiations.

Notes

References

Further reading
 
 

Baseball pitching
Baseball strategy
2010s neologisms
Tampa Bay Rays